An Taisce – The National Trust for Ireland (meaning "the store" or "the treasury"), established in June 1948, is a non-governmental organisation (NGO) active in the areas of the environment and built heritage in Ireland.  It considers itself the oldest environmental and non-governmental organisation in Ireland. Naturalist Robert Lloyd Praeger was its first president.

An Taisce is a membership organisation and charity, not a state or semi-state organisation. However, it receives  government funding for specific programmes, such as Blue Flag beaches, Green Schools and the annual National Spring Clean, and it has a statutory role in certain planning and environmental processes in the country.

Role
An Taisce's range of expertise extends across Ireland's natural, built, and social heritage. It seeks to educate, inform, and lead public opinion on the environment, to advocate and influence policy, and to manage a small portfolio of heritage properties.

Statutory roles
The Planning Acts provide for An Taisce, and about 20 other prescribed bodies, to be informed of all planning applications in areas of scenic beauty or high amenity significance or where architectural, archaeological or environmental issues need to be considered. Local authorities are required, in certain defined circumstances under the Planning & Development Regulations, to consult An Taisce on development proposals.

Operations
The organisation is split into three operational divisions:
 The Environmental Education Unit operates nationwide programmes on behalf of the Irish government's Department of the Environment, Community and Local Government, the National Transport Authority and the European Union, such as the Blue Flag water quality accreditation programme and Green Schools Programme that aims to promote higher environmental standards in schools.
 The Environmental Advocacy Unit monitors roughly 5% of all planning (local authority development approval) applications made annually, making submissions on a small number of those received, and appealing about 300 decisions a year to An Bord Pleanála, the statutory planning appeals board. The Advocacy Unit also monitors environmental standards and co-ordinates policy formation from the elected advocacy committees amongst the membership.
 The Properties Unit takes ownership of and looks after properties that have either historical significance or are environmentally sensitive. The properties listed below are taken care of by both professional staff and volunteers who are involved with the day-to-day management of income generating properties such as Tailors' Hall (which it also makes available for private hire) and the restoration of important resources such as the Boyne Navigation.

Structure
The organisation comprises over 5,000 members, with a range of membership fees.  Some members are also organised in local organisations.  Overall steering of the organisation is in the hands of a council, which in turn elects a board of management, and other internal policy and operational committees.

Trust properties
 Tailors' Hall, Back Lane, Dublin (headquarters, base for 17 staff)
 Booterstown marsh Nature Reserve, Dublin
 Boyne Navigation and Towpath, County Meath
 The Crane, Gort Weigh House, County Galway
 Crocknafarragh, County Donegal
 The Grove, Morehampton Road Wildlife Sanctuary, Dublin 
 The Gull Islands and Rough Island, Mulroy Bay, County Donegal
 Howth's Old Courthouse, County Dublin
 Kanturk Castle, County Cork
 Mongan Bog, County Offaly
 Mullaghmore, County Clare
 Oweninny Bog, County Mayo

See also
 National trust, with a listing of National Trusts worldwide

References

External links
 An Taisce – National Trust for Ireland

1948 establishments in Ireland
Organizations established in 1948
Environmental organisations based in Ireland
Conservation in the Republic of Ireland
Cultural heritage of Ireland
National trusts
Environmental charities